Liberal Judaism may refer to:
 Reform Judaism, a religiously liberal worldwide Jewish movement, widely also known as "Liberal Judaism"
Nederlands Verbond voor Progressief Jodendom (Liberal Judaism (Netherlands)), the Dutch branch of Reform Judaism
 Liberal Judaism (United Kingdom), one of the British branches of Reform
 (Sometimes) non-Orthodox branches of Judaism collectively, including the above as well as Conservative Judaism, Reconstructionist Judaism etc.